Urner is a surname. Notable people with the surname include:

Catherine Murphy Urner (1891–1942), American composer
Joseph Urner (1898–1987), American sculptor, painter, and etcher 
Milton Urner (1839–1926), American politician

See also
Turner (surname)